This is a list of recordings of Don Carlos, an opera by Giuseppe Verdi, known as Don Carlo in its Italian-language versions. Don Carlos premiered as a five-act French grand opera at the Théâtre Impérial de l'Opéra in Paris on 11 March 1867. In 1883, Verdi created a revised 4-act (Milan) version, which has generally been performed and recorded in Italian. In 1886, Ricordi published a 5-act (Modena) version without the ballet with the first act added to the 4-act 1883 revision. The 1886 Modena version has been recorded in French and in Italian. Since 1973, some performances in Italian and in French have restored music cut before the Paris premiere, especially the introduction to Act 1 (with a chorus of woodcutters).

Audio recordings in French

Video recordings in French

Audio recordings in Italian

Video recordings in Italian

Recordings in German

References
Notes

Sources
Amazon discography of 25 recordings, accessed 3 March 2009
Commentary by Geoffrey Riggs on some recordings of Don Carlos on operacast.com retrieved 27 January 2010
Recordings of Don Carlos / Don Carlo on operadis-opera-discography.org.uk Retrieved 27 January 2010

Opera discographies
Operas by Giuseppe Verdi